Sweet Baby James is the second studio album by American singer-songwriter James Taylor, released on February 1, 1970, by Warner Bros. Records.

The album includes two of Taylor's earliest successful singles: "Fire and Rain", and "Country Road", which reached number three and number thirty seven on the Billboard Hot 100, respectively. The album itself reached number three on the Billboard Top LPs & Tapes chart. 

Sweet Baby James made Taylor one of the main forces of the ascendant singer-songwriter movement in the early 1970's and onward. The album was nominated for a Grammy Award for Album of the Year, in 1971, and was listed at number 104 on Rolling Stones 500 Greatest Albums of All Time. In 2000 it was voted number 228 in Colin Larkin's All Time Top 1000 Albums.

Background
The album, produced by Peter Asher, was recorded at Sunset Sound, Los Angeles, California, between December 8 and 17, 1969, at a cost of only $7,600 (US$ in  dollars) out of a budget of $20,000. Taylor was "essentially homeless" at the time the album was recorded, either staying in Asher's home or sleeping on a couch at the house of guitarist Danny Kortchmar or anyone else who would have him.

The song "Suite for 20 G" was so named because Taylor was promised $20,000 (US$ in  dollars) once the album was delivered.  With one more song needed, he strung together three unfinished songs into a "suite", and completed the album.

The album produced two charting singles: "Fire and Rain", backed by "Anywhere Like Heaven", which peaked at number three on the Billboard Hot 100 on October 31, 1970, and "Country Road", backed by "Sunny Skies", which peaked at number 37 on March 20, 1971. An additional single, "Sweet Baby James", backed by "Suite for 20 G", did not chart.

Critical reception

Reviewing for Rolling Stone in 1970, Gary von Tersch observed in the music "echoes of the Band, the Byrds, country Dylan and folksified Dion", which Taylor manages to negotiate into a "very listenable record that is all his own". Village Voice critic Robert Christgau was harsher in his appraisal of the album, saying that "Taylor's vehement following bewilders me; as near as I can discern, he is just another poetizing simp. Even the production is conventional. For true believers only." In a retrospective review, AllMusic's William Ruhlmann was more receptive to "Taylor's sense of wounded hopelessness", believing it reflected "the pessimism and desperation of the 1960s hangover that was the early '70s" and "struck a chord with music fans, especially because of its attractive mixture of folk, country, gospel, and blues elements, all of them carefully understated and distanced."

Accolades
 In 2001 the TV network VH1 named Sweet Baby James the 77th greatest album of all time.
 In 2003, the album was ranked number 104 on Rolling Stone magazine's list of 500 Greatest Albums of All Time, maintaining the rating in a 2012 revised list, dropping to number 182 in a 2020 revised list.

Track listing
All songs by James Taylor unless otherwise noted.

Side one
"Sweet Baby James" – 2:54
"Lo and Behold" – 2:37
"Sunny Skies" – 2:21
"Steamroller" – 2:57
"Country Road" – 3:22
"Oh, Susannah" (Stephen Foster) – 1:58

Side two
"Fire and Rain" – 3:20
"Blossom" – 2:14
"Anywhere Like Heaven" – 3:23
"Oh Baby, Don't You Loose Your Lip on Me" – 1:46
"Suite for 20 G" – 4:41

Personnel
Musicians
James Taylor – guitar, vocals
Danny Kortchmar – guitar
Red Rhodes – steel guitar
John London – bass guitar
Randy Meisner – bass guitar on "Country Road" and "Blossom"
Bobby West – double bass on "Fire and Rain"
Chris Darrow – fiddle, violin 
Carole King – piano, backing vocals
Russ Kunkel – drums
The horn players are uncredited.

Technical
Jack Bielan – brass arrangements
Peter Asher – producer
Bill Lazerus – engineer
Darrell Johnson – mastering
Ed Thrasher –  art direction 
Henry Diltz – photography

Charts

Weekly charts

Year-end charts

Certifications

References

External links
 Album online on Radio3Net a radio channel of Romanian Radio Broadcasting Company

1970 albums
James Taylor albums
Albums produced by Peter Asher
Warner Records albums
Albums recorded at Sunset Sound Recorders